Ellen Sandell (born 26 November 1984) is an Australian politician and environmentalist. She has represented the electorate of Melbourne in the Parliament of Victoria since 2014 as a member of the Australian Greens. She is currently the Deputy Leader of the Victorian Greens.

She was a recipient of the Young Environmentalist of the Year Award in 2009 and director of the Australian Youth Climate Coalition between 2011 and 2012.

Education
Ellen Sandell grew up in Mildura, where she attended St Joseph's College. She went on to study at the University of Melbourne, graduating in 2008 with a Bachelor of Arts (majoring in Spanish and linguistics) and a Bachelor of Science (majoring in genetics). She joined the Australian Youth Climate Coalition in 2007, and became director in 2011.

Career
Whilst at university she became involved in student politics and was elected as the environment officer for the University of Melbourne Student Union in 2007. From 2007 to 2009 Sandell was employed as a policy adviser in the Victorian Department of Premier and Cabinet working on the Brumby Labor Government's climate change strategy and Green Paper. Sandell worked for the Australian Youth Climate Coalition (AYCC) between 2009 and 2012 serving as general manager before becoming the group's National Director. After departing the AYCC Sandell worked as the ACT Greens Party campaign manager for Simon Sheikh's unsuccessful senate campaign in the 2013 Australian federal election. In 2013 she was pre-selected as the Australian Greens Victoria candidate at the 2014 state elections for the seat of Melbourne.

Sandell won the seat of Melbourne in the 2014 state election, against Labor incumbent Jennifer Kanis. She then held the seat against the same Labor opponent on a slightly smaller margin at the 2018 election. Following that election Sandell was appointed deputy leader of a reduced Greens party-room in the Victorian Parliament, serving with leader of the party Samantha Ratnam.

Personal
Sandell has three children: Ada (born 2017), Gabriel (born 2019), and Luca (born 2022).

References

External links
Website
 Parliamentary voting record of Ellen Sandell at Victorian Parliament Tracker

1984 births
Living people
Members of the Victorian Legislative Assembly
Australian environmentalists
Australian women environmentalists
Australian Greens members of the Parliament of Victoria
University of Melbourne alumni
People from Mildura
21st-century Australian politicians
Women members of the Victorian Legislative Assembly
21st-century Australian women politicians